Pleasant View, West Virginia may refer to the following communities in West Virginia:
Pleasant View, Jackson County, West Virginia
Pleasant View, Lincoln County, West Virginia
Pleasant View, Marion County, West Virginia